Đorđe Protić (Bela Crkva, 1793 — Belgrade, 7 December 1857) was a politician and judge.

He was promoted to the rank of major-general. During the rule of Prince Miloš Obrenović, he worked in the judiciary at Kragujevac, then the capital of Serbia, until 1829. He and Avram Petronijević were sent to Constantinople in 1829 to negotiate with the Sublime Porte, according to the Akkerman Convention, the return of six territories (severed from Serbia in 1813), and recognize Serbia's territorial integrity within the Ottoman Empire.

He was a member of the council (minister) from 3 February to 17 March 1835; president of the court of the Belgrade district; member of the commission for the preparation of laws from 1837; deputy to the Prince's Representative from 1838; representative (prime minister) and minister for foreign affairs from 3 May 1840 to 26 October 1842. He was in exile from 1842 to 1857.

References

1793 births
1857 deaths
Government ministers of Serbia
19th-century Serbian people
Defence ministers of Serbia
Foreign ministers of Serbia
Interior ministers of Serbia